William Verelst (1704–1752) was an 18th-century English painter.

Biography
Verelst was baptized at St Martin-in-the-Fields.  It is more likely he was the son of John Verelst and not the son of Cornelius Verelst. He was certainly the grandson of Herman Verelst and a cousin of Maria Verelst. He is known for portraits, still lifes, and paintings of birds. One of his best known paintings is Audience Given by the Trustees of Georgia to a Delegation of Creek Indians, dated 1734 or 1735 and depicting influential Muscogee leaders Tomochichi and Senauki in conference with English officials.

The Oxford Dictionary of National Biography online says "William Verelst was included in the Dictionary of National Biography in the article on Simon Verelst under the name Willem Verelst and was erroneously described as the son of Cornelius Verelst", and he was in fact "the fifth of eight children of the painter John Verelst (c.1675–1734)".

Family tree

References

External links

William Verelst on Artnet

1704 births
1752 deaths
18th-century English painters
English male painters
Painters from London
18th-century English male artists